Last Call for Vitriol is the fourth professionally released full-length album by Superdrag, released by Arena Rock Recording Co. in 2002.  Bassist Sam Powers decided to leave the band following the tour for Last Call for Vitriol; and during the making of the album, John Davis became a devout Christian.  After finishing the tour in 2003, the band went into hiatus and the original lineup reconvened in 2007.

Nick Raskulinecz was set to produce the album, but pulled out to work with the Foo Fighters' One by One.

Track listing
"Baby Goes to 11" (Davis) 4:01 
"I Can't Wait" (Davis, Powers, Coffey) 3:18
"The Staggering Genius"  (Davis, Powers, Coffey) 4:02
"So Insincere" (Davis) 3:52
"Extra-Sensory" (Davis) 3:21
"Feeling Like I Do" (Davis) 5:18
"Way Down Here Without You" (Davis, Powers) 4:29
"Safe & Warm" (Davis, Powers) 3:40
"Remain Yer Strange" (Powers) 3:11
"Her Melancholy Tune" (Davis, Powers) 3:25
"Stu" (Powers) 3:01
"Drag Me Closer to You" (Davis) 4:01

Personnel 
 John Davis – vocals, electric guitar, acoustic guitar, pedal steel, electric bass
 Mic Harrison – electric guitar
 Sam Powers – electric bass, electric guitar, acoustic guitar, vocals
 Don Coffey, Jr. – drums

References

External links
Arena Rock Recording Co.

Superdrag albums
2002 albums
Arena Rock Recording Company albums